Patricio Arquez (born 12 April 1980) is an Argentine former professional tennis player.

Tennis career
Arquez competed mainly in ATP Challenger and ITF Futures events, reaching a career best singles ranking of 222 in the world. He was runner-up at the Quito Challenger in 2000 and made an ATP Tour main draw appearance in 2001, when he lost in the first round of a tournament in Vina del Mar, as a qualifier.

ITF Futures titles

Singles: (2)

Doubles: (3)

Personal life
Arquez is married to an American fashion designer and the couple have two children.

References

External links
 
 

1980 births
Living people
Argentine male tennis players